San Luis Coastal Unified School District is a school district primarily in San Luis Obispo, California.

List of schools

Elementary schools 
 Baywood Elementary School
 Bishop's Peak Elementary School
 Charles E. Teach Elementary School
 C.L. Smith Elementary School
 Del Mar Elementary School
 Hawthorne Elementary School
 Los Ranchos Elementary School
 Monarch Grove Elementary School
 Pacheco Elementary School (named in honor of Romualdo Pacheco)
 Sinsheimer Elementary School

Middle schools 
 Laguna Middle School
 Los Osos Middle School

High school 
 Morro Bay High School
 Pacific Beach High School
 San Luis Obispo High School

Adult school 
 Adult School
 Parent Participation Program

References

External links
 

School districts in California
School districts in San Luis Obispo County, California